DeepStar Six  (released in the Philippines as Alien from the Deep) is a 1989 American science-fiction horror film about the struggles of the crew of an underwater military outpost to defend their base against the attacks of a sea monster (possibly a giant eurypterid). It was released in January 1989. The film's main actors and supporting players included Greg Evigan, Taurean Blacque, Nancy Everhard, Cindy Pickett, Miguel Ferrer, Nia Peeples, and Matt McCoy.

Plot
DeepStar Six is an experimental deep-sea US Naval facility, crewed by a mix of 11 military and civilians, now in the final week of their tour. The project is headed by John Van Gelder,  to test underwater colonization methods, while overseeing the installation of a new nuclear missile storage platform. Already nearing his deadline, Van Gelder's plans are threatened when geologist Burciaga discovers a massive cavern system under the site. Van Gelder orders the use of depth charges to collapse the cavern, to the dismay of Dr. Scarpelli, who wants to study the potentially primordial ecosystem inside.

The ensuing detonation collapses part of the seabed, forming a massive fissure in the ocean floor. Submarine pilots Osborne and Hodges send an unmanned probe to explore, but lose contact and venture in after it. Upon finding the probe, they detect a large sonar contact moments before being attacked and killed by an unseen entity. The aggressor then attacks the observation pod, leaving Joyce Collins and a dying Burciaga trapped inside as it teeters on the edge of the ravine. Captain Laidlaw and submarine pilot McBride - who is also Collins' lover - attempt a rescue. They dock with the pod and rescue Collins, but the unstable hatch door closes on Laidlaw. Mortally wounded, he floods the compartment, forcing McBride and Collins to return to their ship and leave without him.

The remaining crew now prepare to abandon the base, but the missile platform must first be secured. Without Laidlaw, facility technician Snyder is forced to interpret the unfamiliar protocol. When prompted by the computer to explain the reason, Snyder reports "aggression" (due to the creature). The computer jumps to the conclusion that an enemy military force is attacking and advises the humans to detonate the missile warheads. Snyder complies and the resulting nuclear explosion creates a shockwave that damages DeepStar Six and the cooling system for the base's nuclear reactor. With failed life support, they begin repairs to restore power and pressure for the decompression procedure.

Engineer Jim Richardson ventures outside in a JIM suit to effect repairs, but the creature comes after him, leading Scarpelli to conclude it is attracted to light. The crew retrieves his suit and hauls him through the airlock, but the creature forces its way inside and bisects him. The team retreats as the creature consumes the panic-stricken Scarpelli. Arming themselves with shotguns and harpoons with explosive cartridges, they venture back in to finish repairs. They succeed, but the creature attacks and Van Gelder dies when he accidentally backs into Snyder's harpoon. They escape to the med lab. Already badly stressed, Snyder quickly begins to unravel with guilt and fear. After a hallucination of Van Gelder, Snyder jumps into the escape pod and launches. However, since he has not undergone decompression, the pressure change from the ascent causes him to burst.

McBride swims through the flooded base to the minisub, to use it as their means of escape. While he is gone, the creature bursts into the med lab and Diane Norris attacks it with an overcharged defibrillator. Norris electrocutes herself and the creature as it attacks her, allowing Collins and McBride to escape, fleeing before the reactor goes critical. The sub breaches the surface, where they deploy a raft, only for the creature to emerge. McBride discharges the minisub's fuel, then fires a flare, killing the creature as the sub explodes. McBride soon resurfaces and joins Collins, as they wait for a Navy rescue team to arrive.

Cast
Taurean Blacque as Captain Phillip Laidlaw, station commander
Nancy Everhard as Joyce Collins
Cindy Pickett as Dr. Diane Norris, physician
Miguel Ferrer as Snyder, mechanic
Greg Evigan as McBride, submarine pilot
Matt McCoy as Jim Richardson, submarine co-pilot
Nia Peeples as Dr. Scarpelli, marine biologist
Marius Weyers as Dr. John Van Gelder
Elya Baskin as Dr. Burciaga, geologist
Thom Bray as Johnny Hodges, submarine pilot
Ronn Carroll as Osborne, submarine co-pilot

Production
Producer Cunningham developed the idea in 1987, with the express purpose of being the first release on the slate of upcoming underwater action/sci-fi films. Originally, Robert Harmon was going to direct the film. However, when he left, Cunningham stepped in to direct the film with a budget of $8,000,000.

The creature was initially designed by Chris Walas, who then turned his production designs over to FX head Mark Shostrom. Shostrom made slight alterations and changed the creature's color scheme. The underwater scenes were shot in Malta, in The Rinella Tank at Fort Ricasoli.

Release
The film was released by TriStar Pictures in the United States on January 13, 1989. It opened on 1,117 screens and debuted in eighth place with a weekend total of $3,306,320. Its final box office total was $8,143,225. In the Philippines, the film was released as Alien from the Deep by Solar Films on April 27, 1989.
 
DeepStar Six was the first release of several underwater-themed feature movies released between 1989 and 1990, including Leviathan, Lords of the Deep, The Evil Below, The Abyss, and The Rift (Endless Descent). With the exception of The Abyss, none of these films were box office hits.

Reception
, on review aggregator website Rotten Tomatoes, the film had a rating of 15%, based on 13 reviews, with an average rating of 4.2/10.

Variety said the film was "diluted by implausibility" due to the monster's appearance being unrealistic rather than threatening, also criticizing the lack of centralized characters.

Time Out criticized the film's predictability and dialogue, stating that the only inventive aspect of the film was the design of the monster. Summarizing, "Cunningham apes Ridley Scott and James Cameron competently enough, and there are scary moments, but he has not got the 'vision thing'. This simply rehashes the phony trappings of countless TV shows, to baldly go where we have been before".

Janet Maslin from The New York Times criticized the film's predictability, lack of suspense and dialogue.

References

External links

1989 films
1980s science fiction horror films
1980s monster movies
1980s science fiction action films
1989 horror films
American action horror films
American monster movies
American natural horror films
American science fiction action films
American science fiction horror films
Carolco Pictures films
1980s English-language films
Films directed by Sean S. Cunningham
Films scored by Harry Manfredini
TriStar Pictures films
Underwater action films
1980s American films